Chogha Sabz may refer to:
Chogha Sabz, Khuzestan
Chogha Sabz, Lorestan
Chpgha Sabz, alternate name of Shahrak-e Edalat, Khuzestan Province